Thomas Crook "Teddy" Duckworth (born 1882) was an English professional football player and manager. As a player, he was an outside right. He played in the Football League and the Southern League for Blackpool, West Ham United and Blackburn Rovers.

Career

Playing career
Born in Blackpool, Duckworth began his career with his hometown club in 1902. He made ten League appearances during the 1902–03 campaign, scoring three goals. He spent the 1903–04 season with West Ham, firstly, then Blackburn Rovers, back in his native Lancashire. After making just one League appearance for Rovers, he returned for a second spell with Blackpool late in the 1904–05 season, but did not make any appearances. The following term, however, he made 24 League appearances and scored two goals, before bringing his short career to a close.

Coaching career
After retiring as a player, and after serving in World War I, Duckworth coached Swiss team Servette between 1921 and 1929, and again briefly in 1930.

He also coached the Swiss national team at the Summer Olympics in 1924 (earning a silver medal) and 1928.

He later coached French team Saint-Étienne between 1934 and 1935, and again between 1936 and 1940, and Lyon between 1945 and 1946.

References
General

Specific

1882 births
English footballers
English football managers
Blackpool F.C. players
West Ham United F.C. players
Blackburn Rovers F.C. players
English Football League players
Southern Football League players
Servette FC managers
Switzerland national football team managers
Sportspeople from Blackpool
Year of death missing
English expatriate football managers
Association football outside forwards
AS Saint-Étienne managers
Olympique Lyonnais managers
English expatriates in Switzerland
Expatriate football managers in Switzerland
English expatriates in France
Expatriate football managers in France
Olympic silver medalists for Switzerland
British military personnel of World War I